John Moore (1756 – 21 May 1834) was an Irish politician.

Moore was the son of John Moore (1726–1809), of Drumbanagher, County Armagh, Member of Parliament for Ballynakill, great-grandson of Arthur Moore, younger son of Garret Moore, 1st Viscount Moore, ancestor of the Earls and Marquesses of Drogheda. His mother was Gertrude Baillie, daughter of Capt. Francis Baillie.

Moore was returned to the Irish House of Commons for Ballynakill in 1783 (succeeding his father-in-law), a seat he held until 1790, and then represented Lisburn until 1798 and Newry between 1799 and 1800. He continued to represent Newry in the British Parliament from 1801–02.

Personal life/death
Moore married Mary Stewart, daughter of Sir Annesley Stewart, 6th Baronet, in 1781. They had no children. He died on 21 May 1834.

See also
Politics of Ireland

References

1756 births
1834 deaths
People from Newry
Members of the Parliament of the United Kingdom for Newry (1801–1918)
Date of birth missing
UK MPs 1801–1802
Irish MPs 1783–1790
Irish MPs 1790–1797
Irish MPs 1798–1800
Members of the Parliament of Ireland (pre-1801) for Queen's County constituencies
Members of the Parliament of Ireland (pre-1801) for County Antrim constituencies
Members of the Parliament of Ireland (pre-1801) for County Armagh constituencies